The Waco Royals are a professional basketball team in  Waco, Texas, and members of The Basketball League (TBL).

History
August 9, 2020, The Basketball League (TBL) announced the Waco Royals  were approved as an expansion franchise for the upcoming 2021 season. The team is owned by Brandon Littles and Russell Renee Huitt   On December 15, 2020, it was announced that Mamodou Diene would be the team's head coach.

References

External links 

Basketball teams in Texas
2020 establishments in Texas
The Basketball League teams